Jutland is a World War I naval strategy video game which simulates individual ship and fleet level combat. It was created by American developers Norm Koger and Jim Rose and published by Storm Eagle Studios.

Gameplay 

Players can choose to play as the Royal Navy or Imperial German Navy and can fight individual naval battles (historical and hypothetical) or full campaigns.

See also 

 Naval warfare
 Great Naval Battles

External links 
Wargamer review

2006 video games
Video games developed in the United States
Windows games
Windows-only games
Ship simulation games
Naval video games
World War I video games